Manuel Pineda Marín is a Spanish communist politician from the United Left coalition who was elected as a Member of the European Parliament in 2019. He is the long-time head of international relations for the Spanish Communist Party (PCE)

On 15 September 2022, he was one of 16 MEPs who voted against condemning President Daniel Ortega of Nicaragua for human rights violations, in particular the arrest of Bishop Rolando Álvarez.

References

Living people
MEPs for Spain 2019–2024
United Left (Spain) MEPs
United Left (Spain) politicians
Year of birth missing (living people)